Erzsébet "Elza" Brandeisz (18 September 1907 – 6 January 2018) was a Hungarian dancer, teacher, and supercentenarian. She was considered a pioneer of expressionist dance in Hungary. During World War II, she hid several Jews in her family's summer home in Balatonalmádi, including the 14-year-old George Soros. In 1995 she was recognized by Yad Vashem as a Righteous Among the Nations.

Early life and education
Brandeisz was born in Rust, Burgenland, Austria on 18 September 1907. She grew up in Budapest, Hungary, in a German family which belonged to the Lutheran church. As a child, she witnessed the coronation of Charles I of Austria in Budapest.

Between 1923 and 1928, she studied dance at the school of Lili Kállai. In the 1930s, she studied in Vienna and in Dresden under Mary Wigman.

Career 
Brandeisz was a dancer and later a state-licensed teacher in a private school for modern dance run by Béláné Lajtai, a Jewish woman. Brandeisz was considered "one of the pioneers of expressionist dance in Hungary". Dance competitions still call a difficult, spinaround movement that she taught the "Brandeisz Jump".

During World War II, to avoid takeover by German Nazis, Brandeisz registered Lajtai's school in her name. When Lajtai was forcibly relocated to a yellow-star house, Brandeisz brought her food and helped her obtain a letter of protection from the Portuguese embassy. Brandeisz also hid  Bözsi Soros and her 14-year-old son, György, in her family's summer house in Balatonalmádi. After emigrating to America, György changed his name to George Soros. The Soros family shared the one-room house with Brandeisz's elderly father, mother, and sister.

In the postwar era, dance was viewed negatively by the new communist government and Brandeisz was banned from performing in 1948. She began teaching gymnastics and sports in Balatonalmádi.

Later life
In 1963, Brandeisz retired and became a museum guide in the Storno House in Sopron, where she worked until 1978. She refused to be supported by George Soros, but she was supported by nurses on his initiative. In 1995, she was honored by Yad Vashem as a Righteous Among the Nations.

In her last years she lived in seclusion in Sopron. At the time of her death on 6 January 2018, Brandeisz was the oldest resident of the city, aged 110.

References

External links
"USC Shoah Foundation Institute testimony of Elza Brandeisz" at the United States Holocaust Memorial Museum

1907 births
2018 deaths
Hungarian female dancers
Hungarian Lutherans
Hungarian people of German descent
Hungarian Righteous Among the Nations
Hungarian schoolteachers
Hungarian supercentenarians
Entertainers from Budapest
20th-century Hungarian educators
21st-century Hungarian educators
20th-century dancers
Women supercentenarians
20th-century Lutherans